"Hillbilly Rock Hillbilly Roll" is a song by English country rock trio the Woolpackers, written by Eddie Phillips and Bob Garner of the Creation and produced by Nigel Wright. The song was created as an attempt to cash in on the line dancing trend that was prominent in the United Kingdom at the time using three actors from the ITV soap opera Emmerdale: Steve Halliwell, Billy Hartman, and Alun Lewis, who performed the song on an episode of the programme.

"Hillbilly Rock Hillbilly Roll" was released as a single in the UK on 4 November 1996 and reached number five on the UK Singles Chart, earning a gold sales certification in October 2022 for sales and streams of over 400,000 units in the UK alone. The track stayed in the UK top 20 for nine weeks and was the country's 41st-best-selling single of 1996.

Track listings
UK CD and cassette single
 "Hillbilly Rock Hillbilly Roll"
 "Line Dancing"
 "Hillbilly Rock Hillbilly Roll" (instrumental)

UK and Irish CD single 
 "Hillbilly Rock Hillbilly Roll"
 "Hillbilly Rock Hillbilly Roll" (Wand's Fully Dramatised club mix)
 "Line Dancing"
 "Hillbilly Rock Hillbilly Roll" (instrumental)

Credits and personnel
Credits are lifted from the UK CD single liner notes.

Studios
 Recorded and mixed at Metropolis Studios, Westside Studios (London, England), Skratch Studios (Surrey, England), and The Enterprise (Los Angeles)

Personnel
 Edwin Michael Phillips – writing
 Robert Anthony Garner – writing
 Nigel Wright – production
 Robin Sellars – engineering
 Lee McCutcheon – programming

Charts

Weekly charts

Year-end charts

Certifications

References

1996 debut singles
1996 songs
Bertelsmann Music Group singles
British country music songs
Emmerdale
RCA Records singles
Song recordings produced by Nigel Wright (record producer)